Glasgow Municipal Airport  is a public use airport located two nautical miles (3.7 km) northwest of the central business district of Glasgow, a city in Barren County, Kentucky, United States. It is owned by the Glasgow Airport Board.

Facilities and aircraft
It has one asphalt paved runway designated 8/26 which measures 5,301 by 100 feet (1,616 x 30 m).

For the 12-month period ending February 8, 2006, the airport had 13,350 aircraft operations, an average of 36 per day: 85% general aviation, 13% air taxi and 1% military. At that time there were 30 aircraft based at this airport: 77% single-engine, 17% multi-engine, 3% jet and 3% helicopter.

References

External links
 Aerial photo as of 10 March 1993 from USGS The National Map
 

Airports in Kentucky
Buildings and structures in Barren County, Kentucky
Transportation in Barren County, Kentucky